Musaddas is a genre of Urdu poetry in which each unit consists of 6 lines-sestain- (misra). Famous early writers employing this form are Mir Anis and Dabeer. Maulana Altaf Husain Hali and Waheed Akhtar are other well-known poets to find expression in this form of poetry. Particularly iconic is Hali's Madd-o-Jazr-e-Islam as an exemplary of this form.

See also
 Mukhammas

References

Urdu-language poetry
Indian poetics
Stanzaic form
Pakistani poetics